A Thousand Cuts is a 2020 Philippine-American documentary film about Maria Ressa, the founder of the online news site Rappler. Directed by Ramona Diaz, it explores the conflicts between the press and the Filipino government under President Rodrigo Duterte.

The film had its world premiere at the Sundance Film Festival on January 25, 2020. It was released in the United States in a limited release and virtual cinemas on August 7, 2020, by PBS Distribution, and was followed by a broadcast on the program Frontline on January 8, 2021.

Synopsis
It follows the conflicts between the press and the Philippine government under president Rodrigo Duterte. It primarily follows Maria Ressa, the founder of the online news site Rappler, which has been subject to scrutiny by Duterte and his supporters, and writers for the website including Pia Rañada, Patricia Evangelista and Rambo Talabong. It also follows Mocha Uson, Samira Gutoc, and Bato dela Rosa as they campaign for seats in the Philippine senate.

Release
The film had its world premiere at the Sundance Film Festival on January 25, 2020. It was also set to screen at South by Southwest in March 2020, however, the festival was cancelled due to the COVID-19 pandemic.

PBS Distribution and Frontline acquired U.S. distribution rights to the film, and briefly made the film available without charge for a limited time on YouTube for Philippine users on June 12 (Independence Day). It also screened at AFI Docs on June 19, 2020.

The film was released in the United States through virtual cinema on August 7, 2020, followed by its Frontline broadcast on January 8, 2021.

Reception
A Thousand Cuts received positive reviews from film critics. The site's critical consensus reads, "A sobering documentary and a stark warning, A Thousand Cuts underscores the importance of the press at a pivotal moment in world history." On Metacritic, the film holds a rating of 81 out of 100, based on 8 critics, indicating "universal acclaim".

See also
Freedom of the press
Censorship
Online journalism

References

External links

Official trailer
Official website

2020 films
2020 documentary films
American documentary films
Documentary films about journalists
Films directed by Ramona S. Diaz
Philippine documentary films
Topic Studios films
2020s English-language films
2020s American films

Accolades
2021 Peabody Award Winner